Hanover Square may refer to:

 Hanover Square, Westminster, in London, England
 Hanover Square, Manhattan, New York City, New York, USA
 Hanover Square (IRT Third Avenue Line), elevated station
 Hanover Square, Syracuse, New York, USA

See also
 Hanover (disambiguation)
 Hanover Square Rooms, London
 Hanover Square Historic District (Horseheads, New York)
 Hangover Square